Susan Abulhawa (born June 3, 1970) is a Palestinian writer and human rights activist and animal rights advocate. She is the author of several books, and the founder of a non-governmental organization, Playgrounds for Palestine. She lives in Pennsylvania.
Her first novel, Mornings in Jenin, was translated into 32 languages and sold more than a million copies. The sales and reach of her debut novel made abulhawa the most widely read Palestinian author of all time. Her second novel, The Blue Between Sky And Water, was sold in 19 languages before its release, and was published in English in 2015. Against the Loveless World, her third novel, was released in August 2020, also to critical acclaim.

Early life and education
Abulhawa's parents, born in At-Tur in Jerusalem, were refugees of the 1967 war. Her father, according to one account, "was expelled at gunpoint; her mother, who was studying in Germany at the time, was unable to return and the couple reunited in Jordan before moving to Kuwait, where Abulhawa was born in 1970."

Her parents split shortly after her birth and Abulhawa's childhood was turbulent, moving between Kuwait, the United States, Jordan, and Palestine. She lived in the United States with an uncle until she was 5, then spent several years moving between relatives in Jordan and Kuwait. She lived in Dar el Tifl, a Jerusalem orphanage, from the age of 10 to 13.

At 13, Abulhawa came to the US, where she lived with her father briefly before entering the foster care system in the US. She remained a ward of the court until she emancipated herself at the age of 17 and finished high school, college, and graduate school on her own.

Prior to writing her first book, Abulhawa had a successful career in biomedical science, where she worked as a researcher for a pharmaceutical company.

In addition to three novels, in 2013 Abulhawa published a collection of poetry entitled My Voice Sought the Wind.

Abulhawa is the founder of Playgrounds for Palestine, an NGO that advocates for Palestinian children by building playgrounds in Palestine and UN refugee camps in Lebanon. The first playground was erected in early 2002.

Activism
She is  involved in the campaign for Boycott, Divestment and Sanctions and as a speaker for Al Awda, the Right to Return coalition.

Boycott, Divestment and Sanctions (BDS)
Abulhawa is signatory to the boycott campaign against Israel, including the cultural boycott.  She gave the keynote address at one of the first campus BDS conferences at the University of Pennsylvania.

Abulhawa sees the BDS movement, according to a 2012 profile, "as one of the most effective ways to promote Palestinian rights and achieve justice against Israel's ongoing ethnic cleansing."

She compares Israel to apartheid South Africa. In 2013, Abulhawa declined an invitation from Al Jazeera to participate in a discussion about the Israel-Palestine issue with several Israelis, including some who were highly critical of Israeli policy.

Controversy

In February 2023, invited to speak at the Adelaide Writers' Week festival in Australia, Abulhawa caused controversy due to her Twitter comments describing Ukrainian President Volodymyr Zelenskyy as a "Nazi-promoting Zionist" and accusing him of dragging "the whole world into the inferno of WWIII", leading to three invited Ukrainian authors withdrawing from the event.

Works

Abulhawa's novel Mornings in Jenin, which was published in 2010 by Bloomsbury, has been translated into Arabic by Bloomsbury Qatar Foundation Publishing. It has also been translated into at least two dozen other languages and has become an international bestseller.

The French author and philosopher Bernard-Henri Levy called Mornings in Jenin "a concentration of anti-Israeli and anti-Jewish clichés masquerading as fiction." Abulhawa responded by dismissing Levy as a "French pop star of philosophy and intellectual elitism" and accusing him of "name-calling": "He simply slaps on the word 'anti-Semitism' to discredit any negative portrayal of Israel.... Mr. Levy accuses us of 'demonizing Israel', when in fact, all we do is pull back the curtain, however slightly, to show a dark truth he wishes to keep hidden. I suspect that Mr Levy feels, as most Jewish supporters of Israel do, that he is more entitled to my grandfather's farms than I am. After all, that is really the foundation of Israel, isn't it?"

Filmworks Dubai bought the film rights to Mornings in Jenin, planning to begin production in late 2013. Anna Soler-Pont, head of the Pontas agency, which sold the film rights to the novel, said: "This is going to be a special project. There aren't any epic films on Palestine yet." However, the producer passed away shortly after and the rights reverted to her.  Another producer recently optioned the rights for a TV series.

Novels 
Mornings in Jenin (Bloomsbury, 2010).
 The Blue Between Sky and Water (Bloomsbury, 2015).
Against the Loveless World (Bloomsbury, 2020).

Other 
 Shattered Illusions, anthology (Amal Press, 2002) 
 Searching Jenin, anthology (Cune Press, 2003).
 Seeking Palestine: New Palestinian Writing on Exile and Home anthology (2012)
 My Voice Sought The Wind, poetry collection (Just World Books, November 2013)
 This Is Not A Border: Reportage & Reflections from the Palestine Festival of Literature (2017)

Awards
 The Leeway Foundation Edna Andrade award for fiction and creative non-fiction.
 Best Books Award for Historic Fiction.
 MEMO Palestine Book Award.
 Barbara Deming Memorial Fund Award.
Aspen Words Award Finalist
Arab American Museum Award for Fiction
MEMO Palestine Book Award
Long listed for Rathsbones Folio Prize.
Finalist for the 2020 Athenaeum of Philadelphia Literary Award.

References

External links

Biography - Bloomsbury Publishing
Baby Martyr
Interview With Susan Abulhawa

21st-century American non-fiction writers
21st-century American novelists
21st-century American women writers
21st-century Palestinian women writers
21st-century Palestinian writers
1970 births
American women non-fiction writers
American women novelists
Living people
Palestinian emigrants to the United States
Palestinian non-fiction writers
Palestinian novelists
Palestinian women writers
University of South Carolina alumni